Refiloe Potse (born 11 September 1978) is a former Mosotho footballer who last played as a striker for Linare Leribe. Since 2000, he has won 21 caps and scored nine goals for the Lesotho national football team.

External links

Association football forwards
Lesotho footballers
Lesotho international footballers
1978 births
Living people
People from Maseru